The Queen's Nose is a 1995 BBC children's television series. It was adapted by Steve Attridge from the novel The Queen's Nose written by Dick King-Smith. It ran for seven series.

The television series

The novel was adapted into three television series by the BBC which were broadcast during the CBBC slot between 1995 and 1998. The stories remained faithful to the book, although in the book Harmony is granted only seven wishes compared to the ten wishes being granted upon rubbing the coin in the TV series. The first series by Steve Attridge, directed by Carol Wiseman and edited by Sue Robinson, won the Royal Television Society 1996 award for best Children's Drama,
and the third series also by Steve Attridge winning the Indie Awards 1999 prize for Digital Cinematography. According to a podtail interview with Victoria Shalet in February 2021, the director Carol Wiseman was responsible for her being cast in the role of Harmony Parker after she had been impressed with the actress after working with her on the TV series Goggle-Eyes in 1993.

In 2000, the BBC revived the series with new stories, but without the main character Harmony, with a further four series being made between 2000 and 2003. Many viewers felt that the departure from the novels and the loss of the main character, played by Shalet, diminished the series. The later series did however still feature other members of the Parker family in various roles. Harmony's sister Melody, played by Heather-Jay Jones, stayed on until the penultimate series. As of 2010, The Queen's Nose was no longer repeated on the CBBC Channel.

The Queen's Nose has also been broadcast in Germany, under the name Die Magische Münze (The Magic Coin).

Cast
Harmony Parker–Victoria Shalet (series 1–4)
Melody Parker–Heather-Jay Jones (series 1–6)
Mr Arthur Parker–Stephen Moore (series 1–2, 4–5)
Mrs Audrey Parker–Paula Wilcox (series 1–2, 4–5)
Uncle Ginger–Donald Sumpter (series 1–3)
Gregory–Callum Dixon (series 1–3, 6)
Tom–Anthony Hamblin (series 1, 2)
Granny–Liz Smith (series 2)
Aunt Glenda–Nerys Hughes (series 3)
Dino–Vicki Lee Taylor (series 3)
Grobler–Ian Reddington (series 3)
Himself–Gary Mabbutt (series 1)
Himself –Tony Blackburn (series 2)
Paul–Joe Cadden (series 2, 7)
Sam–Ella Jones (series 4–6, 7)
Sophie–Dominique Moore (series 4–6, 7)
Mrs Dooley–Annette Badland (series 4, 5)
Aaron–Darryl Hutton (series 4)
Pansy–Grace Atherton (series 4–6)
Emily–Montanna Thompson (series 4)
Melody's Agent–Paul Danan (series 6)
Jake–Jordan Metcalfe (series 7)
Gemma–Lucinda Dryzek (series 7)
Chief–David Sterne (series 7)
Wesley–Joshua Garland (series 7)
Duncan–Nicholas Gleaves (series 7)
Nick–Brock Everitt-Elwick (series 7)
Carla–Juliet Cowan (series 7)
Ben–Pablo Duarte (series 6, 7)
Mr Marsh–Bill Bingham (series 7)
Darren–Andrew James Michel (series 7)
Frank–Martin Jarvis (series 7)
Frank Puppeteer–William Todd-Jones (series 7)
Judge–Bob Goody (series 4–one episode)

Owners of The Queen's Nose
 Harmony Parker (series 1 to 3)
 Dino Parker (series 3 alongside Harmony)
 Sam (series 4 to 6)
 Jake (series 7)

Series overview

VHS

Radio dramatisation
In 2011 The Queen's Nose was adapted for radio by Elizabeth Kuti and the hour-long drama was broadcast on Radio 4 Extra on Sunday 26 June 2011. The programme was produced by Heather Larmour.

Radio dramatisation cast

Harmony Parker - Lauren Mote
Uncle Ginger - Rupert Graves
Mr Parker - Richard Lumsden
Mrs Parker - Matilda Ziegler
Melody Parker - Holly Bodimeade

Ratings (CBBC Channel)

References

External links

British Film Institute database entry

Queen's Nose, The
British television shows based on children's books
British children's fantasy television series
British supernatural television shows
1995 British television series debuts
2003 British television series endings
1990s British children's television series
2000s British children's television series
Television series produced at Pinewood Studios
English-language television shows